MPV17 mitochondrial inner membrane protein like 2 is a protein that in humans is encoded by the MPV17L2 gene.

References

Further reading